Maldahia is a village in West Champaran district in the Indian state of Bihar.

Demographics
As of 2011 India census, Maldahia had a population of 3909 in 671 households. Males constitute 52.13% of the population and females 47.86%. Maldahia has an average literacy rate of 46%, lower than the national average of 74%: male literacy is 64.18%, and female literacy is 35.81%. In Maldahia, 24.68% of the population is under 6 years of age.

References

Villages in West Champaran district